Thalamo-cortico-thalamic circuits consist of looped neural pathways that connect the thalamus to the cerebral cortex, and connect the cerebral cortex back to the thalamus. Some researchers propose that such circuits allow the brain to obtain data on its own activity.

See also

Recurrent thalamo-cortical resonance

Thalamic connections